State Road 26 (SR 26) is a  east–west route across North Central Florida.

Route description
The western terminus of SR 26 is at US 19/98/27 Alternate (unsigned SR 55) in Fanning Springs, near the Gilchrist/Levy county line. The route proceeds east through Trenton where it is named West Wade Street and East Wade Street, then into Alachua County and Newberry as West Newberry Road, where it briefly runs through the city's historic district. After running through the historic district, it intersects with US 27-41 (unsigned SR 45), and continues to maintain the same street name even as it passes through the communities of Jonesville and Tioga before encountering the interchange with Interstate 75 just west of Gainesville.

East of the interstate, it runs straight east until the intersection with Northwest 57th Street where it curves to the southeast. SR 26 maintains the same street name until the road approaches State Road 26A, where West Newberry follows the same trajectory onto Southwest Second Avenue, while SR 26 moves onto University Avenue. East of President's Park, the route runs it runs along the northern edge of the University of Florida campus alongside Ben Hill Griffin Stadium, followed by a merge with SR 24 at U.S. Route 441 (13th Street) and SR 20 at former SR 329 (Main Street), separating again near the eastern city limits. Skirting the western shores of Newnan's Lake as well as the state forest named for the lake, it approaches the northern shores of the lake entering the Newnans Lake Conservation Area, where it makes a sharp right turn at the eastern terminus of SR 222. Leaving the preserve area and passing through farmland, the road later crosses US 301 in Orange Heights, although a realignment of SR 26 south of the existing intersection was built by the Florida Department of Transportation between 2010 and 2011 which includes an interchange. The next town along the route is Melrose, where the road enters the community's historic district, crosses the Alachua-Putnam County line and intersects SR 21, before it curves to the northeast and ends at SR 100 in Putnam Hall.

Major intersections

Related routes

County Road 26A

County Road 26A (CR 26A), also known as Newberry Lane, is a former segment of SR 26 that spans from US 27/41 on the southeast corner of a railroad grade crossing to SR 26.

Major intersections

State Road 26A

State Road 26A (SR 26A) is a former section of State Road 26 in Gainesville, Florida. It is locally known as West Newberry Road and Southwest Second Avenue, and runs along the northwest corner of the University of Florida.

State Road 26A contains a large sidewalk for bicycles east of SR 121. The southeast corner of this intersection is also the location of the University of Florida Golf Course.

Major intersections

State Road 26 Truck

Florida State Truck Route 26 in Gainesville, Florida was created  in order to divert trucks form the congested downtown areas of Gainesville. The route begins at the Interstate 75 at Exit 387, and follows that route south. At exit 384, the route is also joined by Truck Route 24 and both routes follow the interstate until leaving at Exit 382 to make an easterly turn onto a new overlap with State Road 121. One block after the interstate, the two truck routes encounter the southern terminus of Florida State Road 331, and SR 121 makes a sharp left turn, while Truck Routes 24 and 26 join SR 331 in an overlap are joined by Florida State Truck Route 121.. At the intersection with U.S. Route 441, the routes are joined by a truck route of that route as well. The four truck routes run northeast along SR 331 and then curve to the north. SR 331 terminates at the east end of the overlap of SRs 20, 24, and 26, which also serves as the terminus of Florida Truck Routes 24 and 26. However US 441 Truck and Florida Truck Route 121 continue to the northeast along SR 24 until reaching their respected parent routes.

References

External links

 
 Routes 20 - 29 at Florida's Great Renumbering

026
026
026
026
026